Joel Smith (born 3 May 1977) is a former Australian rules footballer.

Beginning his career in 1995 as a bright young prospect for St Kilda, Smith was touted as the future of the club.

Smith played in St Kilda’s 1996 AFL Ansett Australia Cup winning side – the club's first AFL Cup win.

He provided 3 good years of service before being incurring a serious anterior cruciate ligament injury requiring reconstruction late in the 1997 home and away season, missing the Saints' finals series.

A contractual dispute meant he moved to Hawthorn at the end of 1997. While he was injured all throughout 1998 and did not play a game, Hawthorn recognised this talent and kept him on the list.

Smith made his return in the 1999 season and his role at the Hawks was as a running half-back, setting up attacking plays. He has been very successful playing this role throughout his career, and in 2001, won All-Australian selection and the Peter Crimmins Medal. He again won All-Australian selection in 2003, was vice captain in the 2005 season, and consistently finished in the top bunch of players in his club's best and fairest award.

Smith retired at the end of the 2007 season, during which Hawthorn returned to the finals for the first time in 6 years, citing that the rapidly improving Hawthorn side was likely to mean reduced opportunities for him in 2008.

Statistics

|-
|- style="background-color: #EAEAEA"
! scope="row" style="text-align:center" | 1995
|style="text-align:center;"|
| 4 || 20 || 6 || 7 || 190 || 99 || 289 || 65 || 25 || 0.3 || 0.4 || 9.5 || 5.0 || 14.5 || 3.3 || 1.3 || 1
|-
! scope="row" style="text-align:center" | 1996
|style="text-align:center;"|
| 4 || 22 || 22 || 22 || 246 || 122 || 368 || 96 || 30 || 1.0 || 1.0 || 11.2 || 5.5 || 16.7 || 4.4 || 1.4 || 1
|- style="background-color: #EAEAEA"
! scope="row" style="text-align:center" | 1997
|style="text-align:center;"|
| 4 || 16 || 23 || 17 || 207 || 94 || 301 || 63 || 17 || 1.4 || 1.1 || 12.9 || 5.9 || 18.8 || 3.9 || 1.1 || 3
|-
! scope="row" style="text-align:center" | 1998
|style="text-align:center;"|
| 11 || 0 || — || — || — || — || — || — || — || — || — || — || — || — || — || — || —
|- style="background-color: #EAEAEA"
! scope="row" style="text-align:center" | 1999
|style="text-align:center;"|
| 11 || 17 || 8 || 12 || 130 || 58 || 188 || 34 || 14 || 0.5 || 0.7 || 7.6 || 3.4 || 11.1 || 2.0 || 0.8 || 2
|-
! scope="row" style="text-align:center" | 2000
|style="text-align:center;"|
| 11 || 17 || 10 || 5 || 131 || 77 || 208 || 52 || 17 || 0.6 || 0.3 || 7.7 || 4.5 || 12.2 || 3.1 || 1.0 || 0
|- style="background-color: #EAEAEA"
! scope="row" style="text-align:center" | 2001
|style="text-align:center;"|
| 11 || 24 || 0 || 5 || 315 || 87 || 402 || 82 || 33 || 0.0 || 0.2 || 13.1 || 3.6 || 16.8 || 3.4 || 1.4 || 7
|-
! scope="row" style="text-align:center" | 2002
|style="text-align:center;"|
| 11 || 5 || 2 || 2 || 62 || 18 || 80 || 19 || 5 || 0.4 || 0.4 || 12.4 || 3.6 || 16.0 || 3.8 || 1.0 || 1
|- style="background-color: #EAEAEA"
! scope="row" style="text-align:center" | 2003
|style="text-align:center;"|
| 11 || 22 || 5 || 6 || 222 || 92 || 314 || 76 || 43 || 0.2 || 0.3 || 10.1 || 4.2 || 14.3 || 3.5 || 2.0 || 3
|-
! scope="row" style="text-align:center" | 2004
|style="text-align:center;"|
| 11 || 22 || 7 || 2 || 261 || 106 || 367 || 73 || 48 || 0.3 || 0.1 || 11.9 || 4.8 || 16.7 || 3.3 || 2.2 || 0
|- style="background-color: #EAEAEA"
! scope="row" style="text-align:center" | 2005
|style="text-align:center;"|
| 11 || 20 || 4 || 4 || 233 || 146 || 379 || 95 || 24 || 0.2 || 0.2 || 11.7 || 7.3 || 19.0 || 4.8 || 1.2 || 5
|-
! scope="row" style="text-align:center" | 2006
|style="text-align:center;"|
| 11 || 19 || 0 || 1 || 199 || 115 || 314 || 111 || 28 || 0.0 || 0.1 || 10.5 || 6.1 || 16.5 || 5.8 || 1.5 || 0
|- style="background-color: #EAEAEA"
! scope="row" style="text-align:center" | 2007
|style="text-align:center;"|
| 11 || 17 || 3 || 5 || 147 || 124 || 271 || 93 || 28 || 0.2 || 0.3 || 8.6 || 7.3 || 15.9 || 5.5 || 1.6 || 0
|- class="sortbottom"
! colspan=3| Career
! 221
! 90
! 88
! 2343
! 1138
! 3481
! 859
! 312
! 0.4
! 0.4
! 10.6
! 5.1
! 15.8
! 3.9
! 1.4
! 23
|}

References

External links

1977 births
Living people
All-Australians (AFL)
Peter Crimmins Medal winners
Hawthorn Football Club players
St Kilda Football Club players
Australian rules footballers from Victoria (Australia)
Murray Bushrangers players
Yarrawonga Football Club players
Australia international rules football team players